Cathedral of Saint Eugene is a cathedral of the Roman Catholic Church in the United States.  It is the mother church and seat of the diocesan bishop of the Diocese of Santa Rosa in California.  It is located in the City of Santa Rosa.  The parish was founded in 1950 and it became a cathedral when the Diocese of Santa Rosa was established by Pope John XXIII on January 13, 1962.  The cathedral was named for the 7th century Pope Eugene I.

History 

The history of St. Eugene's begins over a century before its founding in 1950. In the beginning of the 19th century, newcomers from Mexico, Europe, and the United States began to expand into northern California and into the region of what is now the city of Santa Rosa. Having made contact with the local Pomo peoples, Franciscan friars from the nearby Mission San Francisco Solano in Sonoma established a small adobe asistencia mission at Santa Rosa in 1829. The mission was located on land that is adjacent to where the cathedral now stands and is considered the first permanent building on the Santa Rosa Plain. The mission was abandoned several years after its founding following the Mexican secularization act of 1833. However, it was later converted into the home of one of Santa Rosa's founders, Maria Carrillo, in the late 1830s. The ruins of the adobe still stand, although are in a considerable state of disrepair.

In 1829, a Spanish Franciscan friar by the name of Juan Amorosa came to the mission from the Mission San Rafael Arcángel to convert the local people to Catholicism. On August 30, 1829, at a Pomo village near Flat Rock Park at the confluence of Santa Rosa Creek and Brush Creek, he baptized a young girl into the Christian faith. In accordance with tradition, being the day of the Feast of St. Rose of Lima, the young girl took on the name "Rosa," and thus the creek- and later town- were named Santa Rosa.

For much of its history, the city of Santa Rosa only hosted a single Catholic parish, St. Rose of Lima, which was founded in 1877. However, around the mid-20th century, as the city began to rapidly expand, there came a need for an additional parish to accommodate this growth. On July 1, 1950, Archbishop John J. Mitty of San Francisco approved the completion of the new parish for Santa Rosa. St. Eugene's was located in what was at the time the far eastern end of the city, and the parish was still largely rural. The story of how the cathedral got its name is still somewhat unknown. One local story is that the new church was initially planned to be dedicated as "Our Lady of Fátima," as suggested by the placement of statues dedicated to her above the cathedral's main door, side altar, and gardens. However, due to a surge in popularity for Pope Pius XII after the end of World War II, it is suggested that the people of the diocese wished to honor him using his given name (Eugenio) for the new church. Thus, St. Eugene's was founded and ultimately dedicated to the 7th century Pope Eugene I.

In 1953, St. Eugene's School was opened to serve the growing number of families in the area. In 1962, the Diocese of Santa Rosa was established and the church was elevated to cathedral status. As of 2021, the cathedral has been the seat of six bishops and five pastors. Today St. Eugene's is home to a large and diverse congregation of over 4,300 members, reflecting the region's global Catholic community with many parishioners being of Italian, Irish, Mexican, Filipino, and Vietnamese heritage among many others. The cathedral offers multiple masses throughout the week, including the traditional Tridentine Mass.

Cathedral grounds 

The cathedral grounds cover several acres and are home to a number of buildings, located at the corner of Farmers Lane and Montgomery Drive in Santa Rosa's Montgomery Village neighborhood. The southwest corner of the property is occupied by the Cathedral itself, as well as adjacent parish offices and rectory. Immediately north of the church is the Parish Life Center, home to an adoration chapel, the cathedral's bookstore, and thrift store. The upper part of the grounds are home to St. Eugene's School and the Msgr. Becker Center. The eastern side of the church also has several gardens and statues. The statues and gardens include one dedicated to Our Lady of Fátima, one to St. Joseph, and one depicting Jesus comforting an infant. In 2022, a new shrine was built and dedicated to Saint Juan Diego and Our Lady of Guadalupe. Another large statue of Mary stands next to the parking lot near the Msgr. Becker Center.

Stained glass and art

Like many Catholic churches, St. Eugene's has a number of beautiful examples of stained glass. Most of the cathedral's windows were installed with the church's construction in 1950, and were subsequently restored in 2017. Above the cathedral's main door and behind the organ and choir loft is a large window depicting Christ the King enthroned over the world. In the narthex is a window depicting the 1829 baptism of Rose by Fr. Juan Amorosa, commemorating the beginning of Catholicism in the region. Along the nave are ten windows depicting the Apostles and various saints. Facing the altar from the main entrance, along the left side of the nave, the windows depict: Francis of Assisi and Paul the Apostle; James the Great and Thomas; Matthew and Bartholomew; and Jude and Peter. Along the right side of the nave, the windows depict: Francis Xavier and Patrick; James the Less and Matthias; Philip and Simon; and Andrew and John. There are two additional windows depicting the Four Evangelists, with the window above the door to the left of the altar depicting Luke and John; and Matthew and Mark in the window above the door to the right. There are two smaller windows above the altar that depict the sacraments.

From 2014 to 2017, Bishop Robert Vasa sought to beautify the cathedral's interior, which at the time was rather simple and plain. A massive late 19th-century altar was installed after its removal from the abandoned Ascension of Our Lord church in a dilapidated neighborhood in Philadelphia. The altar, which is made of white marble, has a large mosaic of Jesus giving a sermon to His Apostles, as well as golden angels on its sides. Following its installation, relics belonging to Victoris (a martyred soldier) and Reparata were sepulchered in the main altar, and relics belonging to Fortunatis (a 4th-century martyr) and Paulina in the high altar. New side altars were also constructed on both sides of the sanctuary, with the left side being dedicated to Our Lady of Fátima and the right to Saint Joseph. A statue of Jesus showing his Sacred Heart stands to the right of the St Joseph altar. There is also a plaque with a relief of the cathedral's patron and namesake, Pope Eugene I, to the left of the main altar. There is a wooden niche with a statue of Saint Michael next to the door on the right side of the altar, as well as a wooden niche with a statue of the Christ Child next to the door on the left. A small shrine with an image of a Byzantine style Theotokos and a statue of Jesus can be found in the antechamber through the right altar door.

A large painting of Our Lady of Guadalupe hangs above the door to the right of the altar, as well as a painting of the Divine Mercy. A larger painting of the Divine Mercy also hangs in the rear of the church. A large carved crucifix hangs near the left altar door and carved Stations of the Cross are positioned along the nave. In 2000, a Holy door was installed in the rear of the church to commemorate the anniversary of the third Christian millennium.

Parish organizations

Since its founding, St. Eugene's has been home to a number of organizations and parish groups. Spiritual ministries include various Bible study, prayer, and faith formation groups as well as chapters of the Legion of Mary and Sodality of Our Lady. There is also a chapter of the Society of Saint Vincent de Paul, Knights of Columbus, Italian Catholic Federation, and a Boy Scouts of America troop. The cathedral is also home to a choir and Gregorian chant group.

Pastors 

To date, St. Eugene's Cathedral has had five pastors:
 Ervin J. Becker (1950-1969)
 Gerard Fahey (1970-1981)
 James Gaffey (1981-2004)
 James Pulskamp (2004-2012)
 Frank Epperson (2012–present)

See also
List of Catholic cathedrals in the United States
List of cathedrals in the United States
Carrillo Adobe, a historic ruin located on the grounds of the cathedral

References

External links

 Official Cathedral Site
 Diocese of Santa Rosa in California Official Site

Christian organizations established in 1950
Eugene
Churches in Sonoma County, California
Modernist architecture in California
Roman Catholic Diocese of Santa Rosa
Buildings and structures in Santa Rosa, California
Culture of Santa Rosa, California
1950 establishments in California